The 1949 Buffalo Bills season was their fourth and final season in the All-America Football Conference. The team failed to improve on their previous output of 7-7, winning only five games. They qualified for the playoffs, but lost to the Cleveland Browns who went on to beat the San Francisco 49ers for the final AAFC Championship.

Season schedule

Playoffs

Division standings

References

Buffalo Bills (AAFC) seasons
Buffalo Bills
1949 in sports in New York (state)